Xenortholitha is a genus of moths in the family Geometridae erected by Inoue in 1944.

Species
Xenortholitha corioidea (Bastelberger, 1911)
Xenortholitha dicaea (Prout, 1924)
Xenortholitha euthygramma (Wehrli, 1924)
Xenortholitha exacra (Wehrli, 1931)
Xenortholitha extrastrenua (Wehrli, 1931)
Xenortholitha falcata Yazaki, 1993
Xenortholitha latifusata (Walker, 1862)
Xenortholitha propinguata (Kollar, 1844)

References

Cidariini